The Territorial Defence Force of the Republic of Bosnia and Hercegovina were the first official armed forces of Bosnia and Herzegovina at the beginning of the Bosnian War. They were eventually transformed into the Army of the Republic of Bosnia and Herzegovina.

History
Teritorijalna odbrana (TO) was the name of a local defence reserve force in the former Yugoslav People's Army. The TO were organized in their respective country with a separate command that of the JNA. The TO was a Civilian Home Guard, roughly like a paramilitary or a reserve military force. The regions of the TO were in charge of mobilization with the help of the local population.

TORBiH in Bosnia
The TO was the official army of Bosnia and Herzegovina, along with the separate Bosnian military forces formed by Sefer Halilović the Patriotic League (PL). The TO, from 1991 to April 1992, absorbed all units of the PL and districts military formations into the TO, which was eventually transformed at the end of May 1992 into the Army of the Republic of Bosnia and Herzegovina.

Organization
The TO was organized into seven regions (two refused to join the TORBiH), each controlling about 12 districts (totaling 73 districts, 36 refused to join). On April 15, 1992 all PL units joined the TORBiH.

At the end of April 1992, the TO was reorganized into four regions (Bihać, Sarajevo, Tuzla and Zenica) and two tactical groups that controlled TO, PL and newly formed brigades. The Sarajevo TO was transformed in the general headquarters. There were soon 26 brigades (named after districts).

On 20 May 1992 the TORBiH was renamed the Army of the Republic of Bosnia and Herzegovina.

TORBiH command

April 1992 – May 1992
TORBiH General Headquarters, Sarajevo
Colonel Hasan Efendić (Commander of the TORBiH)
Colonel Stjepan Šiber (Chief of Staff)
Colonel Jovan Divjak (Deputy Chief of Staff)

TORBiH units

March 1991 – March 1992
Independent detachments throughout Bosnia all under the control of the TORBiH.

References

Military units and formations of the Army of the Republic of Bosnia and Herzegovina